The Regge ['rɛɣə] is a river in the Netherlands. It is a tributary to the Vecht of Overijssel. 

The source of the Regge is near the town Goor. It flows north through Rijssen, Nijverdal, and Hellendoorn. The Regge joins the Vecht near Ommen.

Rivers of Overijssel
Salland
Twente
Rivers of the Netherlands